The women's javelin throw event at the 2006 Commonwealth Games was held on March 19.

Results

References
Results

Javelin
2006
2006 in women's athletics